Minsi may refer to several articles:
 Lenape Minsis, phratry of the Lenape - also been referred to as Munsi, Munsee, Monsi, and Muncey.
 Camp Minsi, Scout camp
 The Minsi Trail, also known as Bethlehem Pike
 Minsi Trails Council, Boy Scout Council
 Mount Minsi, a hill on the Pennsylvania side of Delaware Water Gap

See also
Mansi (disambiguation)